Chapter 5: Social Justice.  Chapter 5 of the Fiji Constitution is titled Social Justice.  It is one of the shortest chapters of the constitution, comprising only one section - section 44.

Section 44, the sole section of Chapter 5, charges Parliament with the responsibility to make provision for "effective equality of access" to education and training, land and housing, and participation in commerce and in public service, for groups that are seen to be disadvantaged.  Despite otherwise implicitly affirming the essentially capitalist nature of Fiji, the Constitution recognizes that there are certain sectors of the population who have not shared fairly in Fiji's economic, social, and political development, and that the state has a responsibility to create an environment of equal opportunity.  Unlike socialistic constitutions, the Fiji Constitution does not seek equality of results, but equality of opportunity is presupposed as a basic human right.

Ethnic Fijians and Indo-Fijians are both intended to benefit from this provision.  The multiracial capital, Suva, has excellent educational services, but more rural areas, populated mostly by ethnic Fijians, are often poorly served.  Indo-Fijians predominate in commerce and the professions, while the public service and the Armed Forces are overwhelmingly ethnic Fijian.  This constitutional provision is meant to redress the reasons for these imbalances by authorizing appropriate legislation.  There is a caveat, however: "A program established under this section must not, directly or indirectly, deprive any person not entitled to its benefits of: (a) any position or seniority in the service of the State: (b) any place in an educational or training institution; (c) a scholarship or other financial support; or (d) a right to carry on any business or profession or to enjoy any other opportunity, amenity or service; to which that person has already become, and would otherwise remain, entitled."  In other words, the giving of special help to disadvantaged groups must not discriminate against a member of another group.

An affirmative action program may be established for a maximum of ten years.  It is to be reviewed annually, to assess whether or not its goals are being met, and if so, whether the program is still needed.  On expiry at the end of ten year (or earlier, if it was set to run for a shorter period), it may be renewed by appropriate legislation if the need for it is perceived still to exist.

Chapter 5 recognizes that not all cases of proportional underrepresentation are necessarily the result of disadvantage.  In some cases, the preferences of certain communities may be a factor; religious or cultural objections to certain forms of work may in some cases explain the underrepresentation of a particular community in a particular category of employment.  In formulating affirmative action legislation, such factors are to be taken into account.

1997 Constitution of Fiji